The  is a railway line operated by Japanese private railway company Nankai Electric Railway that runs in Wakayama, Wakayama Prefecture, between  and  stations.

The purpose of the line is to provide a railway link to Wakayama Port that has ferry service to Tokushima in Shikoku. The line is jointly owned by Nankai and Wakayama Prefecture.

History
Opened in 1956 by Nankai from Wakayamashi to later Chikkōchō (then Wakayamakō) for rail connection to its ferry to Shikoku. In 1971 the line was extended to Suiken via present Wakayamakō, by Wakayama Prefecture for the expansion of the port and to provide freight access to then planned lumber transport. The section between Wakayamakō and Suiken was closed in 2002, until then freight train had never operated. The stations between Wakayamashi and Wakayamakō were abandoned in 2005 due to few passengers, then Kubochō Station was renamed .

Descriptions
 Operators:
 Nankai Electric Railway
 Category-1 railway business: Wakayamashi Station - Prefecture-Company Boundary (0.8 km)
 Category-2 railway business: Prefecture-Company Boundary - Wakayamakō Station (2.0 km)
 Wakayama Prefecture
 Category-3 railway business: Prefecture-Company Boundary - Wakayamakō Station (2.0 km)
 Track: Single track

Operations
All trains are operated for the connection to and from Nankai Ferry.
Weekdays
Limited express trains named "Southern" and express trains run through to and from Namba, and local trains run between Wakayamashi and Wakayamako. 2 Namba-bound express trains were changed to the local trains to Wakayamashi on October 1, 2012. The 2 express trains start at Wakayamashi.
Weekends and holidays
6 round trips are operated; 4 are limited express trains named "Southern" which run through to and from Namba, and the other 2 are local trains running between Wakayamashi and Wakayamako.

Stations

References 

Lines of Nankai Electric Railway
Rail transport in Wakayama Prefecture
Railway lines opened in 1956
1067 mm gauge railways in Japan